The Pakhangba Temple, also known as the Pakhangba Laishang, is a Meitei temple dedicated to the God Pakhangba of Sanamahism, the traditional Meitei religion, located beside the Nungseng Eekon, to the left side of the Kangla Sanathong, the western gate of the Kangla Fort in the Imphal West district of Manipur.

Construction 
The recently-constructed Iputhou Pakhangba Laisang temple is an example of Meitei architecture. It is located in the grounds of Kangla Palace.
The construction was carried out by the "Manipur Police Housing Corporation Limited" under the aegis of the "Kangla Fort Board" between December 2008 and January 2010.

On 19 February 2010, along with the performance of religious rites and rituals by the maibas and the maibis invoking God Pakhangba at Nungjeng Pukhri Macha, the Pakhangba Temple was consecrated along with a Hiyang Hiren (royal boat) by Ph. Parijat, the then Health and Family Welfare Minister of Manipur Government. There was also religious procession with priestesses offering Maibi Jagoi to the music of the pena from the Nungjeng Pukhri Macha to the temple.

During the inaugural event, Dr. Kh. Sorojini, the then Director of the Manipur Art and Culture Department, said that the re-construction of the temple of God Pakhangba and the re-installation of the Hiyang Hiren was a long cherished desire of the public.

Features and architectural designs 

The major architectural designs for the 48-feet high Pakhangba temple are the sacred altar dedicated to God Pakhangba and the seven-coloured flag designed roof, symbolising the seven Meitei clans.

Visiting 
The temple is visited by both the followers as well as the non-followers of Sanamahism. 
During November 2018, Maha Chakri Sirindhorn, a princess of Thailand, visited the Pakhangba Temple as a part of her visit to Manipur's Sangai festival. She was accompanied by a Thai media team and the officials of Ministry of External Affairs, Government of India during her visit to the temple.

See also 
 Sanamahi Temple
 Hiyangthang Lairembi Temple
 Hijagang
 Kangla Sanathong
 Statue of Meidingu Nara Singh

References

External links 

Meitei architecture
Cultural heritage of India
Landmarks in India
Meitei culture
Monuments and memorials in India
Monuments and memorials in Imphal
Monuments and memorials in Manipur
Monuments and memorials to Meitei people
Monuments and memorials to Meitei royalties
Pakhangba
Public art in India
Temples in Manipur
Tourist attractions in India